Tarasiiformes is an extinct order of prehistoric ray-finned fish.

Taxonomy
 Order †Tarrasiiformes sensu Lund & Poplin 2002 [Haplistia]
 Family †Tarrasiidae Traquair 1881 emend. Woodward 1891
 Genus †Apholidotos Lund ex Frickinger 1991 nomen novum
 Species †Apholidotos ossna Lund ex Frickinger 1991 nomen novum
 Genus †Paratarrasius Lund & Melton 1982
 Species †Paratarrasius hibbardi Lund & Melton 1982
 Genus †Tarrasius Traquair 1881
 Species †Tarrasius problematicus Traquair 1881

Timeline of genera

Tarrasius is an extinct genus of Tarasiiformes. Tarrasius problematicus (of Mississippian origin, ~ 350 Ma) featured a fully regionalized tetrapod-like spine divided into 5 distinct segments. It is not considered a transitional fossil though, but an extreme example of convergent evolution.

See also

 Prehistoric fish
 List of prehistoric bony fish
 Convergent evolution

Bibliography

References

External links
 Bony fish in the online Sepkoski Database

 
Carboniferous bony fish
Prehistoric ray-finned fish orders